Cogar ("Whisper") is an Irish television documentary series, shown on the Irish language channel TG4. It focuses on people who have been "ignored" or are at the margins of society.

Cogar was first broadcast in 2000, the first episode looking at Dublin's bicycle couriers.

Episodes

Notable episodes
2002: Paddy Fitz, Fear an Hata ("Paddy Fitz, the Man with the Hat"): on the storyteller Paddy Fitzpatrick
2006: Ar Thóir Hy Brasil ("In Search of Hy-Brazil"), a documentary on the mythical island
2008: an episode on Irish Community Care Manchester
2011: Buabhaill ar na Bánta ("Where the Buffalo Roam"), about a water buffalo farmer in County Cork
2011: an episode on Cork's Hadji Bey sweetshop
2011: Éamonn Ó Cathain – An Fear Iarainn ("Eamonn Keane, the Ironman"), covering a County Mayo weightlifter
2014: Bliain an tSneachta Mhóir ("Year of the Big Snow"), on the 1946–47 heavy snowfall
2015: Episode on the four Irish American baseball-playing brothers: Steve O'Neill, Jim O'Neill, Jack O'Neill and Mike O'Neill, who played between 1902 and 1928
2015: Episode on the controversial 1978 TV adaptation of Langrishe, Go Down
2015: Snámh in Aghaidh Easa ("Swimming Against the Current"), about the hazards faced by Aran Islands trawlermen
2016: Diarmuid Lynch – Óglach Dearmadta ("Diarmuid Lynch, Forgotten Warrior"), on the life of Diarmuid Lynch

References

External links 
Official site

Irish-language television shows
2010s Irish television series
2020s Irish television series
TG4 original programming
Irish documentary television series
2000 Irish television series debuts